A crowd is a large and definable group of people.

Crowd or The Crowd may also refer to:

Films
 The Crowd (1928 film), an American silent film directed by King Vidor
 The Crowd (1951 film), an Italian film

Literature
 "The Crowd", a short story by Ray Bradbury included in his collection The October Country
 The Crowd: A Study of the Popular Mind, an 1895 book by Gustave Le Bon

Music
 The Crowd (Nathan King album), 2008
 The Crowd (Rova Saxophone Quartet album), 1986
 "The Crowd", a song by The Cat Empire from the album The Cat Empire
 "The Crowd", a song by Roy Orbison
 Crwth, a Celtic musical instrument also called a crowd
 The Crowd (band), a 1985 British supergroup

Visual arts
 The Crowd (Lewis), a painting by Wyndham Lewish, 1914–1915

Other uses
 Crowd Lu (born 1985), a Taiwanese indie singer and songwriter
 Crowds (anonymity network), a proposed anonymity network for the internet

See also
 
Three's a Crowd (disambiguation)